Lev Davidovich Belkind ((27 August 1896, Myrhorod – November 16, 1969) was a Soviet scientist, engineer and historian; author of numerous publications on the history of science and technology.

His academic activity is associated with the Moscow Power Engineering Institute (Technical University), where he has founded the department of Lighting Engineering in the Physics-Energy Faculty in 1932. In 1937, he became the first dean of the faculty of Electro-Physics upon its formation. Later he has headed the department of History of Engineering

Fluent in Russian, English, French and German, and knowledgeable in additional languages, Prof. Belkind was a prominent researcher and collector of materials on the history of science and technology, both Russian and International. He was considered an authority in the field of scientific history, being an author of unique biographical research work of a number of influential figures in the Russian science.

In recognition of his scientific achievements and contribution he was awarded the "Honored Scientist and Technologist" title. by the Soviet Academy of Sciences.

Partial list of works and publications

Biographical Books

 "Aleksander Nikolayevich Ladygin",
 "Aleksander Ilyich Shpakovsky",
 "Pavel Nikolayevich Yablochkov",, Second Edition: 
 "Karl Adolfovich Krug"
 "Thomas Alva Edison", Short edition:, Full edition:() 
 "Charles Proteus Steinmetz",
 "André-Marie Ampère",, Bulgarian translation:

Technical Dictionaries

 English-Russian tank dictionary 
 English-Russian dictionary on caoutchouc and rubber, Yashunskaya F.I., Chief Editor: L.D. Belkind
 English-Russian Polytechnical Dictionary 
 French-Russian Polytechnical Dictionary 
 German-Russian Hydrotechnical Dictionary 
 International Electro-Technical Dictionary
 International dictionary of lighting engineering, Russian-English-French-German
 German-Russian Chemico-Technological Dictionary 
 English-Russian Dictionary of Machine Elements

Books on the History of Science and Technology

 "History of Engineering", L.D. Belkind, I.Ya. Konfederatov, Ya. A. Shneyberg ( 
 "History of Energy Engineering", L.D. Belkind, O.I. Veselovsky, I.Ya. Konfederatov & Ya.A. Schneiberg 
 "50 years of Moscow Power Engineering Institute",

Articles Published in Collections of Works by Different Authors

 Collection of works on the History of Technology, #3, 1953, Aleksandr Ilyich Shpakovski
 Collection of works on the History of Technology, #6, 1953,
 "Figures in Russian Science" Articles about prominent figures in science 
 Co-editor and author of articles in the Technical Encyclopedia, published in 1927

Autobiography 

 Belkind L. D., My Autobiography, 1946
 Belkind L. D., My Autobiography (Publication of M. V. Kalashnikova), 100 years from the birth of historian of technology 
 Belkind L. D., Memories of my past. 1957-1969

Publications about Prof. Belkind by other authors 
 In memory of Lev Davidovich Belkind, G. I. Ashkenazi, Svetotekhnika Journal №8, 1986
 Historian of Technology L.D. Belkind and his written legacy, M. V. Kalashnikova, VIET Journal #3, 1998

Notes

External links
 Key-cards of works by Prof. Belkind in the Russian National Library (Russian)
 Articles by Prof. Belkind in the library of the Russian State Technical University in Irkutsk (Russian)
 Books by Prof. Belkind in the library of the Russian State Technical University in Irkutsk (Russian)
 Works by Prof. Belkind in the library of the Moscow Engineering Physics Institute (State University) (Russian)
 Archives of works and personal correspondence of Prof. Belkind at the Russian State Archives (Russian)
 Lighting Engineering Dictionary @ Scientific Bookstore Site (Russian)
 English-Russian Polytechnical Dictionary @ Scientific Bookstore Site (Russian)

1896 births
1969 deaths
20th-century Russian engineers
People from Myrhorod
Kharkiv Polytechnic Institute alumni
Academic staff of Moscow Power Engineering Institute
Recipients of the Order of the Red Banner of Labour
Russian electrical engineers
Soviet engineers